Dean Cornwell (March 5, 1892 – December 4, 1960) was an American illustrator and muralist. His oil paintings were frequently featured in popular magazines and books as literary illustrations, advertisements, and posters promoting the war effort. Throughout the first half of the 20th century he was a dominant presence in American illustration. At the peak of his popularity he was nicknamed the "Dean of Illustrators".

Background
Cornwell was born in Louisville, Kentucky. His father, Charles L. Cornwell, was a civil engineer whose drawings of industrial subjects fascinated Cornwell as a child. He began his professional career as a cartoonist for the Louisville Herald. Soon thereafter he moved to Chicago, where he studied at the Art Institute and worked for the Chicago Tribune. In 1915 he moved to New Rochelle, New York, a well known artist colony, and studied in New York City under Harvey Dunn at the Art Students League of New York. Eventually he traveled to London to study mural painting as an apprentice to Frank Brangwyn.

Cornwell's paintings were in Cosmopolitan, Harper's Bazaar, Redbook, and Good Housekeeping magazines, illustrating the work of authors including Pearl S. Buck, Lloyd Douglas, Edna Ferber, Ernest Hemingway, W. Somerset Maugham, and Owen Wister. He painted murals for the Los Angeles Public Library, the Lincoln Memorial Shrine in Redlands, California, "The History of Transportation" in the Eastern Airlines Building (now 10 Rockefeller Plaza), executed Federal Art Project murals in two post offices, Chapel Hill, North Carolina and Morganton, North Carolina, with other murals in the Warwick New York Hotel in New York City, the New England Telephone headquarters building in Boston, the Davidson County Courthouse and Sevier State Office Building in Tennessee, and the Centre William Rappard in Geneva, Switzerland. His mural for the Los Angeles Public Library was a rendering of the history of California.  Cornwell's Feb 1953 cover of a riverboat for True was later made into a US Postage stamp as part of the USPS's 2001 American Illustrators series.

Cornwell taught and lectured at the Art Students League in New York. He served as president of the Society of Illustrators from 1922 to 1926, and was elected to its Hall of Fame in 1959. In 1934, he was elected into the National Academy of Design as an Associate Academician, and became a full Academician in 1940. He served as president of the National Society of Mural Painters from 1953 to 1957.

Artist and illustrator James Montgomery Flagg said, "Cornwell is the illustrator par excellence-his work is approached by few and overtopped by none...he is a born artist."

Cornwell died on December 4, 1960 in New York City at the age of 68.

Examples of Cornwell's Work

Notes

References
 Anne-Leslie Owens, Dean Cornwell, The Tennessee Encyclopedia of History and Culture
Telephone Men and Women at Work
Dean Cornwell: Dean of Illustrators, by Patricia Janis Broder, Hardcover 240 pages Publisher: Collectors Pr (October 1, 2000)

External links
Dean Cornwell collection at the National Museum of American Illustration
Works in the Mildred Lane Kemper Art Museum
Dean Cornwell artwork can be viewed at American Art Archives web site
 
 

1892 births
1960 deaths
20th-century American painters
American male painters
American muralists
Artists from Louisville, Kentucky
Artists from New Rochelle, New York
Art Students League of New York faculty
Art Students League of New York alumni
Painters from Kentucky
National Academy of Design members
People of the New Deal arts projects
American magazine illustrators
20th-century American male artists